= Sam Kwong =

Sam Kwong from the City University of Hong Kong was named Fellow of the Institute of Electrical and Electronics Engineers (IEEE) in 2014 for contributions to optimization techniques in cybernetics and video coding.
